Hōne Te Kāuru Taiapa  (10 August 1912 – 10 May 1979), also known as John Taiapa, was a Māori master wood carver and carpenter of Ngati Porou.  He was the younger brother of master Māori carver Pine Taiapa.  The two brothers worked closely with politician Sir Apirana Ngata on reintroducing the Māori arts & crafts to the country after World War II. Both men, for example, demonstrated Māori carving skills by carving and restoring lost or damaged traditional  marae all along the North Island of New Zealand alongside fellow carvers or students they had been training as part of a programme by the New Zealand Department of Education to educate teachers to reintroduce Māori arts and crafts to school children. New Zealand poet Hone Tuwhare included a poem about the wood carver, "On a theme by Hone Taiapa," in his 1973 collection Something Nothing.

He led the team of carvers that carved most of the pieces for Arohanui ki te Tangata in Lower Hutt, which was opened in September 1960.

In the 1960 Queen's Birthday Honours, Taiapa was appointed a Member of the Order of the British Empire, for cultural services to the Māori people, especially in the field of wood carving.

He was the head and one of the founders of the New Zealand Māori Arts and Crafts Institute (NZMACI) Wood Carving School at Whakarewarewa, Rotorua when it opened in 1967. He then trained and guided the next generation of Master Carvers to take his place upon his passing in 1979. Notable disciples of Taiapa are Clive Fugill and James Rickard, both now widely considered as ‘Tohunga Whakairo’ or Master Carvers.

References

1912 births
1979 deaths
20th-century New Zealand sculptors
20th-century New Zealand male artists
Carpenters
Māori culture
New Zealand Māori carvers
New Zealand Members of the Order of the British Empire
New Zealand woodcarvers
Ngāti Porou people